Pottsville usually refers to the city of Pottsville, Pennsylvania, in the United States.

Pottsville may also refer to:

Other communities
Pottsville, New South Wales, Australia
Pottsville, Arkansas, United States
Pottsville, Kentucky, United States
Pottsville, Texas, United States
Pottsville, Ontario, Canada - destroyed in 1911 due to Great Porcupine Fire

Geology
Pottsville Escarpment, a resistant sandstone belt in eastern Kentucky, USA
Pottsville Formation, a bedrock unit in the Appalachian Mountains of North America

Sports
Pottsville Colts, a defunct American minor league baseball club that played from 1883 to 1907 in Pennsylvania
Pottsville Maroons, a now-defunct American football team that played from 1925 to 1929 in Pennsylvania

Other
Pottsville Area School District (Pennsylvania)

See also

Pottstown (disambiguation)